Eroessa is a Neotropical genus of butterflies in the family Pieridae. The genus is monotypic containing the species Eroessa chiliensis of Chile.

References

Anthocharini
Pieridae of South America
Monotypic butterfly genera
Taxa named by Edward Doubleday
Pieridae genera
Endemic fauna of Chile